Hatting may refer to:

Hatmaking
Hatting, Denmark
Hatting Parish in Horsens Municipality, Denmark
Hatting, Tyrol, Austria
Hatting, Upper Austria, Austria, in Sankt Marienkirchen am Hausruck
John Hatting, ex-husband and singing partner of Lise Haavik
Flat-hatting, Aerobatic trick involving extremely low flight

See also
Hattin (disambiguation)